Godziszów  is a village in Janów Lubelski County, Lublin Voivodeship, in eastern Poland.

References

villages in Janów Lubelski County